Charlie 2 (also known as C-2, Combat Base C-2, C-2 Strongpoint and Firebase Charlie 2) is a former U.S. Marine Corps, U.S. Army and Army of the Republic of Vietnam (ARVN) firebase north of Đông Hà in central Vietnam.

History

1966-7
The base was established 12.5 km northwest of Đông Hà and 5 km southeast of Con Thien to protect the land route to Con Thien and particularly the C-2 bridge immediately north of the base.

By December 1967 all bunkers at C-2 had been completed and all minefields laid and perimeter barbed wire emplaced.

The Marines constructed Route 561 linking Con Thien to Route 9.

1968–9
During 1968 further improvements were made to the bunker system at C-2, totalling 81 reinforced bunkers.

In August 1969, responsibility for C-2 passed from the Marines to the 1st Brigade, 5th Infantry Division (Mechanized).

1970-2
On 21 May 1971 30 US infantrymen, many from Company A, 1st Battalion, 61st Infantry Regiment, were killed when a People's Army of Vietnam (PAVN) 122mm rocket hit their bunker at Charlie 2.

On 1 April 1972 in the face of the PAVN's Easter Offensive the base was abandoned by the ARVN.

Current use
The base has been turned over to farmland.

References

Military installations of the United States Marine Corps in South Vietnam
Installations of the United States Army in South Vietnam
Installations of the Army of the Republic of Vietnam
Buildings and structures in Quảng Trị province